Yelyzaveta Merenzon (born August 12, 1999) is a Ukrainian-born American group rhythmic gymnast. She was the alternate for the 2020 United States Olympic team. She won the 5 hoops event final with the American group at the 2017 Pan American Championships and won two silver medals at the 2019 Pan American Games.

Career 
Merenzon competed as a junior at the 2014 Pacific Rim Championships and won a silver medal in the group all-around. She also competed at the 2014 Junior Pan American Championships and won gold in the five hoops and 10 clubs, and bronze in the group all-around.

Merenzon competed with the senior U.S. team at the 2017 World Championships in Pesaro and finished twelfth in the group all-around. She then competed at the 2017 Pan American Championships in Daytona Beach, Florida, and won the gold medal in the 5 hoops and silver medals in the group all-around and 3 balls + 2 ropes.

Merenzon competed at the 2019 Pan American Games and won the silver medal in the group all-around and in the 5 balls. Then at the 2019 World Championships in Baku, the American team finished tenth in the group all-around.

At the 2021 Pan American Championships in Rio de Janeiro, Merenzon and the U.S. team won the bronze medals in the all-around, and in both the 5 balls and the 3 hoops + 4 clubs. The United States qualified for the 2020 Olympic Games after Japan's host spot was reallocated. Merenzon was selected to represent the United States at the 2020 Summer Olympics as a reserve.

References

External links 
 

Living people
1999 births
American rhythmic gymnasts
Pan American Games medalists in gymnastics
Pan American Games silver medalists for the United States
Gymnasts at the 2019 Pan American Games
Medalists at the 2019 Pan American Games
Ukrainian emigrants to the United States
21st-century American women